Troy Sidney Brown (born April 3, 1971) is an American former professional basketball player.

Born in Lynn, Massachusetts, Brown played collegiately at Providence College where he played small forward.  As a senior in 1994–95, he averaged 12 points and 7.9 rebounds per game and shot 52 percent from the field. He was selected by the Atlanta Hawks in the second round (45th pick overall) of the 1995 NBA Draft, though he did not play any games as a Hawk, or in the National Basketball Association (NBA). He played in the Continental Basketball Association for the Grand Rapids Mackers before being traded to the Connecticut Pride.

References

External links 
 SI.com Profile - Troy Brown

1971 births
Living people
African-American basketball players
American men's basketball players
Atlanta Hawks draft picks
Basketball players from Massachusetts
Brewster Academy alumni
Connecticut Pride players
Grand Rapids Mackers players
Montpellier Paillade Basket players
Providence Friars men's basketball players
Small forwards
Sportspeople from Lynn, Massachusetts
The Governor's Academy alumni
21st-century African-American sportspeople
20th-century African-American sportspeople